Leptodeuterocopus hipparchus is a moth of the family Pterophoridae that is known from Brazil and Venezuela.

Adults are on wing in June and October.

External links

Deuterocopinae
Moths described in 1921
Moths of South America